Wided Bouchamaoui, also transcribed Ouided Bouchamaoui, (born 1961) is a Tunisian businesswoman who since 2011 has been leader of the Tunisian Confederation of Industry, Trade and Handicrafts (UTICA). As leader of the organization she took from 2013 part in Tunisian National Dialogue Quartet which led the latter organization to receive the 2015 Nobel Peace Prize.  The French news magazine Jeune Afrique has identified her as one of the Top 25 Business Women in Africa. In 2014 she won the Oslo Business for Peace Award for her work in UTICA.

Career 

Bouchamaoui was born into a wealthy business family. Her grandfather, Ahmed, started a civil engineering company. Her father took over part of the firm and made it into Hédi Bouchamaoui & Sons which specialized in oil, textile and other industry. After having obtained a DESS degree in international trade and marketing, Wided worked for a period in her father's firm before starting her own firm with about 200 employees, specializing in cotton.

Following the Tunisian revolution in 2011, she became leader of the Tunisian Confederation of Industry, Trade and Handicrafts (UTICA), an employers union. In September 2013 she, as leader of the organization, co-formed the Tunisian National Dialogue Quartet, whose aim was to secure a transition to democracy.  The group included Wided Bouchamaoui as President of UTICA, Houcine Abassi as the Secretary General of the Tunisian General Labour Union (UGTT), Abdessattar ben Moussa as the President of the Tunisian Human Rights League (LTDH), and Mohamed Fadhel Mahmoud as the president of the Tunisian Order of Lawyers.  The group was disestablished in December 2014 after the 2014 Tunisian parliamentary election took place in October.

The Quartet was awarded the 2015 Nobel Peace Prize "for its decisive contribution to the building of a pluralistic democracy in Tunisia in the wake of the Jasmine Revolution of 2011". Along with other leaders of the Quartet, Houcine Abassi, Mohammed Fadhel Mafoudh and Abdessatar Ben Moussa, Bouchamaoui traveled to Oslo to collect the Nobel Prize on December 10, 2015. Bouchamaoui emphasized the collaborative nature of the group's activities, and the importance of encouraging people: "We are here to give hope to young people in Tunisia, that if we believe in our country, we can succeed." The committee's decision has been described as "rewarding hope rather than a finished product".

Personal life 

She has two sons.

Awards 

 Nobel Peace Prize 2015
 G8 Deauville Partnership Women in Business Award (2013)
 Oslo Business for Peace Award (2014)
 Golden Aegis of the Arab Organization of Civil Liberty (2015)
 Grand Officer of the Order of the Republic of Tunisia (2015)
 Commander of the Legion of Honour of France (2015)
 Jeane J. Kirkpatrick Award (2016)
 Honorary Degree from Paris Dauphine University (2017)
 International Award of Excellence "Farmasi" (2018)

References 

1961 births
Living people
21st-century Tunisian businesspeople
People of the Arab Spring